A Sports HD is a Pakistani sports channel. It was launched on 16 October 2021 and is a part of ARY Digital Network which earlier planned in 2016. On 9 October 2021, Wasim Akram, Waqar Younis, Wahab Riaz, Misbah ul Haq announced to join as its cricket analysts panel. In November 2022, Broadcast 2022 FIFA World Cup with Exclusive Pre & Post Match Analyst Show.

Programming

International Cricket

Franchise Cricket

International Football

See also 

 ATN ARY Digital (Canada)
 ARY News
 ARY Films
 List of Pakistani television serials
 List of Pakistani television stations
 ARY Qtv
 List of programs broadcast by ARY Digital

References

External links 
 

ARY Digital
24-hour television news channels in Pakistan
Television channels and stations established in 2021
2021 establishments in Pakistan
Urdu-language mass media
Television stations in Pakistan
Television stations in Karachi
Sports television in Pakistan